Derrick Ng (born September 21, 1987) is a male Canadian  badminton player from Vancouver, British Columbia. He has been the top ranked men's doubles player on the continent and a contender in major international competitions. He is the current and five consecutive times National champion in men's doubles and has won several national and international titles since 2010 in both men's and mixed doubles. His older brother, Toby Ng, is a renowned, competitive badminton player and a professional coach at the Bellevue Badminton Club. Derrick is also an entrepreneur who created Skinetex Kinesiology Tape and also spends time coaching advanced to elite level athletes at the Bellevue Badminton Club like his brother does.

Achievements

Pan American Games
Men's Doubles

Pan Am Championships
Men's Doubles

Mixed Doubles

BWF International Challenge/Series
Men's Doubles

Mixed Doubles

 BWF International Challenge tournament
 BWF International Series tournament

Canadian National Championships

Men's Doubles

Mixed Doubles

References

External links

Profile at Badminton.ca
Profile at Olympique.ca

Canadian male badminton players
Living people
1987 births
Sportspeople from Vancouver
Canadian people of Chinese descent
Commonwealth Games competitors for Canada
Badminton players at the 2014 Commonwealth Games
Badminton players at the 2011 Pan American Games
Pan American Games bronze medalists for Canada
Pan American Games medalists in badminton
Medalists at the 2011 Pan American Games